Manuel Estabilla Arguilla (Nagrebcan, Bauang, June 17, 1911 – beheaded, Manila Chinese Cemetery, August 30, 1944) was an Ilokano writer in English, patriot, and martyr.

He is known for his widely anthologized short story "How My Brother Leon Brought Home a Wife," the main story in the collection How My Brother Leon Brought Home a Wife and Other Short Stories, which won first prize in the Commonwealth Literary Contest in 1940.

His stories "Midsummer" and "Heat" were  published in Tondo, Manila by the Prairie Schooner.

Childhood in Nagrebcan and education
Most of Arguilla's stories depict scenes in Barrio Nagrebcan, Bauang, La Union, where he was born. His bond with his birthplace, forged by his dealings with the peasant folk of Ilocos, remained strong even after he moved to Manila, where he studied at the University of the Philippines, finished his BS in Education in 1933, and  became a member and later the president of the U.P. Writer's Club and editor of the university's Literary Apprentice.

Writing career 
He married Lydia Villanueva, another talented writer in English, and they lived in Ermita, Manila. Here, F. Sionil José, another seminal Filipino writer in English, recalls often seeing him in the National Library, which was then in the basement of what is now the National Museum.  "You couldn't miss him", José describes Arguilla, "because he had this black patch on his cheek, a birthmark or an overgrown mole.  He was writing then those famous short stories and essays which I admired."

He became a creative writing teacher at the University of Manila and later worked at the Bureau of Public Welfare as managing editor of the bureau's publication Welfare Advocate until 1943. He was later appointed to the Board of Censors.

World War II and presumed death 
He secretly organized a guerrilla intelligence unit against the Japanese.

On August 5, 1944, he was captured and tortured by the Japanese army at Fort Santiago.

In one account, he was later transferred to the grounds of the Manila Chinese Cemetery. Along with him were guerrilla leaders, along with more than 10 men. They were then asked to dig their own graves, after which, they were immediately, one by one, beheaded with swords. His remains, as well as the others', have never been recovered, as they were dumped into one unmarked grave.

The remains of the executed men were said to be located and identified by their compatriots after the war, after a Japanese-American officer (working in the Japanese Army as a spy), revealed what he had seen and the location of the grave after the executions of August 30 of 1944. At present, their remains lie within the Manila North Cemetery..

References
 Dictionary of Philippine Biography, Volume 3, Filipiniana Publications, Quezon City, 1986
 Filipino Writers in English by Florentino B. Valeros and Estrellita V. Gruenberg, New Day Publishers, Quezon City, 1987
 "Maysa a Ruknoy ken ni Manuel E. Arguilla," RIMAT Magazine, Quezon City, October 2004

External links
 Manuel Arguilla  - biography of Manuel Arguilla found in PinoyLit.webmanila.com
 Full text: "Morning in Nagrebcan" by Manuel Arguilla
 Analysis of Midsummer on Lit React

Filipino writers
Ilocano-language writers
People executed by Japanese occupation forces
1911 births
1944 deaths
People from La Union
People from Ermita
University of the Philippines alumni
Executed Filipino people
Filipino torture victims
Ilocano people
Burials at the Manila North Cemetery